The University of Michigan Law School (Michigan Law) is the law school of the University of Michigan, a public research university in Ann Arbor, Michigan. Founded in 1859, the school offers Master of Laws (LLM),  Master of Comparative Law (MCL), Juris Doctor (JD), and Doctor of the Science of Law (SJD) degree programs.

Widely considered to be one of the most prestigious law schools in the United States, Michigan Law has ranked among the top 14 law schools in the country every year since the U.S News Rankings were first released in 1987. In the 2023 U.S. News ranking, Michigan Law ranked 10th overall.

Notable alumni include U.S. Supreme Court Justices Frank Murphy, William Rufus Day, and George Sutherland, as well as a number of heads of state and corporate executives. Approximately 98% of Class of 2019 graduates were employed within ten months of graduation; its bar passage rate in 2018 was 93.8%.

The school enrolls about 1020 students and employs about 81 full-time faculty members (60 tenured and tenure-track and 21 in clinical and legal practice).

History

The law school was founded in 1859. By 1870, it was the largest law school in the country.

In 1870, Gabriel Franklin Hargo graduated from Michigan Law as the second African American to graduate from law school in the United States. In 1871 Sarah Killgore, a Michigan Law graduate, became the first woman to both graduate from law school and be admitted to the bar.

Although the law school is part of the public University of Michigan, less than 2% of the law school's expenses are covered by state funds.  The remainder (97–98% of Michigan Law's budget) is supplied by private gifts, tuition, and endowments.

In 2009, Michigan Law began a $102 million enterprise to construct a new law building that would remain loyal to the English Gothic style. The enterprise was fully funded by endowments and private gifts. 2009 also marked the school's sesquicentennial celebration.  As a part of the festivities, Chief Justice John Roberts visited the school and participated in the groundbreaking ceremony for the new building.  The building was dedicated in 2012 and called South Hall.  In December 2018, South Hall was renamed Jeffries Hall, after a record $33 million donation from real estate developer Christopher M. Jeffries.

Campus

Built between 1924 and 1933 by the architectural firm York and Sawyer with funds donated by attorney and alumnus William W. Cook, the Cook Law Quadrangle comprises four buildings:

Hutchins Hall, the main academic building, named for former Dean of the Law School and President of the University, Harry Burns Hutchins
The Legal Research Building
John Cook Dormitory
The Lawyer's Club, providing additional dormitory rooms and a meeting space for the residents of the Quad, is highlighted by a Great Lounge, and a dining room with a high-vaulted ceiling, an oak floor, and dark oak paneling.
In 2012, extensive renovations of the Lawyers Club were undertaken thanks in part to a $20 million gift from Berkshire Hathaway vice-chairman Charles T. Munger, and was re-opened on August 19, 2013 for the 2013 school year.

Admissions and rankings
Michigan Law was ranked third in the initial U.S. News & World Report law school rankings in 1987. Michigan Law is also one of the "T14" law schools, schools that have at some point been in the top 10 since U.S. News began publishing rankings. In the 2021 U.S. News ranking, Michigan Law is ranked 9th overall. The 2010 Super Lawyers rankings placed Michigan as second. Michigan Law is currently ranked 6th for Clinical Training and 6th for International Law.  In a 2011 U.S. News "reputational ranking" of law schools by hiring partners at the nation's top law firms, the University of Michigan Law School ranked 4th. Michigan Law ranked 15th among U.S. law schools, tied with the Georgetown University Law Center, for the number of times its tenured faculty's published scholarship was highly cited in legal journals during the period 2010 through 2014.

Admission to Michigan Law is highly selective. For the class entering in the fall of 2021, 819 applicants were accepted out of a total of 7,693, an acceptance rate of 10.65%. Out of those 819 accepted applicants, 313 students enrolled. The 25th and 75th LSAT percentiles for the 2021 entering class were 166 and 172, respectively, with a median of 171. The 25th and 75th undergraduate GPA percentiles were 3.61 and 3.93, respectively, with a median of 3.84.

Publications
Michigan Law School students publish several law journals in addition to the Michigan Law Review, the sixth oldest legal journal in the U.S. These include:
University of Michigan Journal of Law Reform
Michigan Journal of International Law
Michigan Journal of Gender and Law
Michigan Journal of Race & Law
Michigan Telecommunications and Technology Law Review
Michigan Journal of Environmental and Administrative Law
Michigan Business & Entrepreneurial Law Review, formerly the Michigan Journal Private Equity and Venture Capital Law

Journal membership is obtained through participation in writing competitions.

Moot court competitions
Students may compete in intramural moot court competitions, the oldest of which is the Henry M. Campbell Moot Court Competition, established in 1926 and first held in the 1927–1928 academic year. Other moot court competitions include the Child Welfare Law Moot Court Competition, Criminal Law Moot Court Competition, the Entertainment Media and Arts Moot Court Competition, the Environmental Law Moot Court Competition, the Intellectual Property Moot Court Competition, the Jessup International Law Moot Court Competition, the Vis International Arbitration Moot Court, the Native American Law Students Association Competition, the Manfred Lachs Moot Court, Michigan Law Corporate Counseling Competition, and the 1L Oral Advocacy Competition.

Clinical programs
Michigan Law's clinical program allows students to provide direct representation to clients under the supervision of full-time faculty. There are 18 clinical programs, including the Child Advocacy Law Clinic, the Entrepreneurship Clinic, the Environmental Law Clinic, the Federal Appellate Litigation Clinic, the International Transactions Clinic, the Michigan Innocence Clinic, the Transactional Lab, and the Unemployment Insurance Clinic.

Student organizations
Michigan Law offers a wide array of student organizations centered around various interest areas, including politics, pro bono work, community service, race, gender, religion, and hobbies. Student organizations organize various annual events, from student pageants such as Mr. Wolverine to the Michigan Law Culture Show.

Externships and internships
Michigan's externship program is designed to provide students with real-world legal experience and advanced research opportunities beyond what is separately available in either a classroom or a clinic. Externships are available in places such as Switzerland, South Africa, and India.

Student Funded Fellowships
Student Funded Fellowships (SFF) is a program designed to fund Michigan Law students who accept public interest summer job, particularly to help 1Ls finance the living costs associated with their summer jobs. SFF is governed by a board of law students and operates independently of the law school. Board members head fundraising efforts throughout the year, ranging from Donate a Day's Pay (DADP), in which highly paid law firm summer associates donate a day's salary to SFF, to a grand auction in the spring that invites bids on various donated items, including sports tickets, art, meals, and activities with faculty members. Around the time of the auction, board members review applications for summer funding and select a limited number of qualified students for grants. As of 2022, SFF awarded these select applicants $6,500. Students not otherwise selected for the grant, or students who do not plan to pursue public interest after law school but nonetheless need income for their summer positions, are entitled to a $5,000 loan for their summer expenses. This loan is facilitated by the law school. The loan is repaid on a sliding scale depending on how much money these students make during their 1L and 2L summers. As of 2022, if a student does not make more than $18,000 across their two summers, the loan is completely forgiven.

Employment and cost of attendance
According to Michigan's ABA-required employment disclosures, 98% of the graduates of the Class of 2021 were employed or seeking an advanced degree. This includes the 94.2% of the class who had obtained jobs requiring a J.D. Of the Class of 2021, 55% were employed by firms of greater than 100 attorneys and 18% obtained clerkships.  Michigan's Law School Transparency under-employment score is 5.8%,  indicating the percentage of the Class of 2021 who are unemployed, pursuing an additional degree, or working in a non-professional, short-term, or part-time job nine months after graduation. The majority of Michigan Law grads work in New York, Illinois, Michigan, California, and Washington, D.C.

Tuition at Michigan for the 2020–2021 academic year is $63,680 for residents of the state of Michigan and $66,680 for non-residents. The estimated cost of living for a Michigan student is $21,900. Assuming no tuition increases, a typical three-year course of study at Michigan therefore costs $256,740 (or $85,580 per year) for residents and $265,740 (or $88,580 per year) for non-residents.

Notable faculty

Current
Theodore J. St. Antoine, Dean Emeritus – legal philosopher and labor law scholar
Samuel Bagenstos – constitutional scholar and expert on disability rights
Evan Caminker, Dean Emeritus – constitutional law scholar
Edward H. Cooper – civil procedure scholar
Steven P. Croley – expert on administrative and regulatory law
Phoebe C. Ellsworth – scholar of law and psychology
Samuel R. Gross – Criminal law expert widely cited for work on exonerations
Daniel Halberstam – comparative constitutional law, transnational law and European law scholar
James C. Hathaway – international refugee law expert and scholar of public international law 
John Hudson – English legal historian
Ellen D. Katz – voting rights and election law scholar
Thomas E. Kauper – scholar of property law and antitrust
Vikramaditya Khanna – expert on international commercial law and the laws of India
James E. Krier – property law scholar
Jessica Litman – intellectual property scholar
Kyle D. Logue – insurance, tax and private law scholar
Catharine MacKinnon – feminist theorist, scholar and activist
Barbara McQuade – United States Attorney for the Eastern District of Michigan from 2010 to 2017
John A. E. Pottow – scholar of international commercial law, bankruptcy and consumer finance
Richard Primus – constitutional theorist 
Margaret Radin – legal philosopher, contract and property theorist
Margo Schlanger – civil rights scholar and founder of the Civil Rights Litigation Clearinghouse
Rebecca J. Scott – legal historian
Bruno Simma – German international law expert; served as a judge on the International Court of Justice from 2003 until 2012
Mark D. West, Dean and Nippon Life Professor of Law- scholar of international commercial law, criminal law and Japanese law
James Boyd White – founder of the "Law and Literature" movement 
James J. White – Commercial law expert
Christina B. Whitman – Francis A. Allen Collegiate Professor of Law

Former
Nathan Abbott – former dean of Stanford Law School and property law scholar
T. Alexander Aleinikoff – international law scholar and former dean at Georgetown University Law Center
Omri Ben-Shahar –  law professor
Lee Bollinger – President of Columbia University, former President of the University of Michigan
Henry Billings Brown – Justice of the Supreme Court of the United States
Thomas M. Cooley – Legal scholar and Chief Justice of the Michigan Supreme Court
Harry T. Edwards – Senior Judge on the United States Court of Appeals for the District of Columbia Circuit
Heidi Li Feldman – law professor
Herbert Funk Goodrich – Judge on the United States Court of Appeals for the Third Circuit and former dean of the University of Pennsylvania Law School
Harry Hutchins – fourth President of the University of Michigan
Charles Wycliffe Joiner – Judge for the United States District Court for the Eastern District of Michigan
Yale Kamisar, Professor Emeritus – criminal law and procedure expert (known as the "father of Miranda" for his influential role in the landmark U.S Supreme Court decision in Miranda v. Arizona (1966).)
Douglas Laycock – constitutional law scholar
Debra Ann Livingston – Judge on the United States Court of Appeals for the Second Circuit
Wade H. McCree – first African American appointed to the U.S. Court of Appeals for the Sixth Circuit
John W. Reed – civil procedure expert
Henry Wade Rogers – former Judge on the United States Court of Appeals for the Second Circuit
Lawrence G. Sager – Constitutional theorist and former dean at the University of Texas Law School
Joseph Sax – environmental law scholar known for developing the public trust doctrine
Joel Seligman – President of the University of Rochester
A. W. B. Simpson – British legal historian
Scott J. Shapiro – legal philosopher
David S. Tatel – judge on the United States Court of Appeals for the District of Columbia Circuit 
Elizabeth Warren – bankruptcy expert and senior United States senator from Massachusetts
Joseph H. H. Weiler – European law expert

Notable alumni

 Michael T. Cahill, Dean of Brooklyn Law School
Roger Carter (LL.M., 1968), Dean of University of Saskatchewan College of Law; recipient of Order of Canada.
William W. Cook (J.D. 1882), heavily published and cited author of textbooks on corporate law; donor of the quadrangle to Michigan
Ann Coulter (J.D. 1988) Conservative author and commentator.
Jordan Harbinger (J.D. 2006) Broadcaster and talk show host.
George Crockett Jr. (LL.B. 1934) Civil Rights activist; helped found the National Lawyers Guild. First African American lawyer hired by the Department of Labor. Recorder's Court Judge, Detroit, Michigan, 1966–74; U.S. House of Representatives (D-Mich.), 1980 – 1991.
Clarence Darrow (attended), famous trial lawyer; defense counsel in the Scopes Monkey Trial and Leopold and Loeb
William R. Day (LL.B. 1870), United States Secretary of State, 1898; United States Supreme Court Associate Justice, 1903–1922
John Feikens (J.D.) was a politician and judge from the U.S. state of Michigan. He was the Senior Judge, U.S. District Court for the Eastern District of Michigan (1986–present). Feikens had the unusual honor of being nominated to the same district court by three presidents.
Harold Ford Jr. (J.D. 1996) – former U.S. Representative from Tennessee; Democratic Leadership Council chair
Richard Gephardt (J.D. 1965) – U.S. Representative from Missouri (1977–2005). Served as House Majority Leader from 1989 to 1995, and as Minority Leader from 1995 to 2003.
Ronald M. Gould (J.D. 1973), Judge, the United States Court of Appeals for the Ninth Circuit
James P. Hoffa (LL.B. 1966) – President, International Brotherhood of Teamsters
Sada Jacobson (J.D. 2011), Olympic fencing silver and bronze medalist 
Valerie Jarrett, (J.D. 1981), Senior Advisor to President Barack Obama
Amalya Lyle Kearse (J.D. 1962) – Judge, United States Court of Appeals for the Second Circuit
Cornelia Groefsema Kennedy (J.D. 1947) – Senior Judge, United States Court of Appeals for the Sixth Circuit
Raymond Kethledge (J.D. 1993) – United States circuit judge of the United States Court of Appeals for the Sixth Circuit.
Frank Murphy (LL.B. 1914), United States Attorney General, 1939, and United States Supreme Court Associate Justice, 1940–1949
Rob Portman (J.D. 1984), United States senator from Ohio; former Director of the Office of Management and Budget 
Branch Rickey (LL.B. 1911), Major League Baseball executive and Hall of Famer; created the modern minor league system and signed Jackie Robinson to a contract, breaking the sport's 20th-century color line
Richard Riordan (J.D. 1956), Mayor of Los Angeles, 1993–2001
Ken Salazar (J.D. 1981), former U.S. Senator from Colorado and United States Secretary of the Interior, 2009 to 2013.
Rick Snyder (J.D. 1982) Former CEO of Gateway; former Governor of Michigan
George Sutherland (attended 1891), United States Supreme Court Justice
John D. Voelker (J.D. 1928) justice of the Michigan Supreme Court; author of Anatomy of a Murder.
Moses Fleetwood Walker (attended 1881–1882) – Baseball player and author; first African-American to play major league professional baseball
Sarah Killgore Wertman (LAW: LLB 1871), née Sarah Killgore, the first woman to be admitted to the Bar of any state in the United States of America.
Sam Zell (J.D. 1966) – Real estate development tycoon; founder of EQ Office; former National Association of Real Estate Investment Trusts chairman and current chairman and majority owner of the Tribune Company; billionaire

See also
List of University of Michigan law and government alumni
List of University of Michigan legislator alumni
List of University of Michigan people

Notes
 University of Michigan: Diversity Research & Resources, Proposal 2 Information.  Link to UM website
 Coalition to Defend Affirmative Action v. Granholm, No. 2:06-cv-15024 (E.D. Mi.) (Lawson); Nos. 06–2640, 06–2642 (6th Cir. 2007).
 January 10, 2007 statement by Dean Evan Caminker.

References

External links
 
Official website

 
Law schools in Michigan
Law School
Educational institutions established in 1859
1859 establishments in Michigan
University of Michigan campus